Talis cashmirensis is a moth in the family Crambidae. It is found in Kashmir.

References

Ancylolomiini
Moths described in 1919
Moths of Asia